Acacia heterochroa is a shrub belonging to the genus Acacia and the subgenus Phyllodineae that is endemic to south western Australia.

Description
It has terete and ribbed branchlets that are dusted in a white powder. The new shoot tend to be a reddish colour with stipules that are easily detached. It produces yellow flowers from April to December. The simple inflorescences have large spherical flower-heads containing 5 to 12 loosely packed bright lemon yellow flowers. The purplish-red pods are thick and woody and dry to a black colour.

Taxonomy
The species was first formally described by the botanist Bruce Maslin in 1995 as part of the work Acacia Miscellany. Acacia myrtifolia (Leguminosae: Mimosoideae: section Phyllodineae) and its allies in Western Australia as published in the journal Nuytsia. It was reclassified as Racosperma heterochroa in 2003 by Leslie Pedley then transferred back to the genus Acacia in 2006.
There are two recognised subspecies:
 Acacia heterochroa subsp. heterochroa
 Acacia heterochroa subsp. robertii
It belongs to the Acacia myrtifolia group.

Distribution
It is native to an area along the south coast in the Goldfields-Esperance and Great Southern regions of Western Australia where it is found on hilltops and ridges growing in gravelly lateritic soils. The shrub is mostly found between Holt Rock and Ravensthorpe in open woodland or mallee communities.

See also
List of Acacia species

References

heterochroa
Acacias of Western Australia
Plants described in 1995
Taxa named by Bruce Maslin